Gambling in Singapore is controlled by several statutes,  being the Casino Control Act, Gambling Control Act and the Gambling Regulatory Authority of Singapore Act. The Gambling Regulatory Authority of Singapore (GRA) was formed on 1 August 2022, by reconstituting the Casino Regulatory Authority of Singapore (CRA), to regulate gambling in Singapore. It is a statutory board under the Ministry of Home Affairs of Singapore.

Singapore Pools is the only operator that is legally allowed to run lotteries in the country. Casinos are allowed in Singapore in the form of integrated resorts (IR), such as Marina Bay Sands and Resorts World Sentosa, where the casino is integrated in a major resort property that includes a hotel, together with convention facilities, entertainment shows, theme parks, luxury retail and fine dining. Societies are allowed to operate slot machines in designated rooms under the Gambling Control Act.

History 
In 1923, gambling was briefly legalized in the then-British colony of Singapore, but the experiment led to gambling addiction and increased crime, and gambling was criminalized again within three years.

In the following decades, the operation of legal gambling in Singapore was limited to the government-run Singapore Pools for lotteries, and Singapore Turf Club for horse racing.  However, during a parliament session on 18 April 2005, Lee Hsien Loong, the prime minister of Singapore, announced the cabinet's decision to develop two casinos and associated hotels and malls in Marina South and Sentosa. Prior to the development of the integrated resorts, locals would primarily gamble on cruise ships that sailed in the international waters just beyond Singapore's control. These cruising casinos remained a draw to those who were deterred by the S$100 entry fee for the land-based casinos.

The government stated that the aim of the project was to boost Singapore's tourism industry which had been facing intense competition from other destinations around the region, particularly from nearby Bangkok and Hong Kong, which has since also considered legalization of casinos in the wake of initiatives in Singapore. Even closer to home, Malaysia has long had a legal casino accompanied theme park on Genting Highlands, which proved popular with Singaporean tourists. The IRs in Singapore were expected to create about 35,000 jobs directly and indirectly. In addition to the casinos, the IRs will have other amenities including hotels, restaurants, shopping and convention centers, theatres, museums and theme parks. The industry was expected to invest US$7.1 billion in integrated resorts (US$3.5 billion in Marina Bay; US$3.6 billion in Resorts World).

In 2008, the CRA was formed to regulate gambling in management and operation of the casinos in Singapore. It was reconstituted to form the GRA in 2022.

Public debate and criticisms 
The plan to build the integrated resorts was subject to considerable debate among Singaporeans even until 2014. Several groups, such as those belonging to the Muslim and Christian communities as well as social workers, openly expressed their disapproval of the casinos. Concerns were raised about the negative social impact of casino gambling, citing worries that the casinos could encourage more gambling and increase the risk of compulsive gambling. Activist groups argued that a casino could also lead to undesirable activities often associated with gambling, including money laundering, loan sharks or even organized crime.

Lee acknowledged the downsides of having integrated resorts and the concerns expressed by the public. He promised that there would be safeguards to limit the social impact of casino gambling. He stated there would be restrictions on the admission of local people into the casinos. Lee announced a steep entrance fee of S$100 per entry or S$2,000 per year (Increased to $150 per entry or $3,000 per year on 4 April 2019) and a system of exclusions for all Singaporeans. In addition, the casinos would not be allowed to extend credit to the local population.

The six-month consultative period gave the opportunity for many sections of the population to voice their opposition to the casinos, including a petition that attracted tens of thousands of signatures. When Lee approved the proposal after such widespread criticism, the opposition said that he had overruled consensus.

The issue of casinos in Singapore was brought up by parliamentary members such as Denise Phua suggesting that the place of gambling in Singapore be reviewed until putting in a total ban on remote gambling after the Remote Gambling Bill was passed.

Social issues 
To address social issues arising from the casinos, such as problem gambling, the National Council on Problem Gambling (NCPG) was created in 2005.

In 2017, controversies surrounding Football club operations, which had been known to host slot machine rooms to fund their football activities for more than the past two decades prior to 2014, arose that called for additional safeguards to prevent gambling addicts from frequenting such places from Members of Parliament who had also raised concerns over current regulations following investigation of Tiong Bahru Football Club which revealed that the then second-tier Football club of the National Football League generated approximately 10 times more revenue from their 29-slot machine operations than what the Tampines Rovers, a top-tier competitor Football club in the Singapore Premier League, had reportedly earned in their 2013/2014 financial year. Other noted cases included Sinchi Football Club, which continued to operate a clubhouse with six slot machines despite having not played in any S.League football game since 2005 and prompted a need to ensure profits from slot operations were going towards funding a club's core purpose--their football activities. 

While football clubs and other registered societies that wanted to run slot machine operations were required to apply for a private lottery permit from police, a condition of the permit only required that entry and use of the slot machine rooms be restricted to members only, but a check by The Straight Times revealed that memberships could be purchased for as low as $5 in comparison to the $100 entrance fee of casinos at the time. As Members of Parliament and gambling counsellors warned that these venues provided an easy and accessible outlet for gambling and after having been called a "back door" for addicts banned from the casinos by Pastor Billy Lee, a founder of Blessed Grace Social Services, a call for an urgent review of the regulations governing these private slot machine clubs was made by MP Seah Kian Peng, the Government Parliamentary Committees chair for Social and Family Development. 

On 20 July 2017, The Ministry of Home Affairs announced that regulations on slot machines would be tightened over the next two years and included changes that added more stringent criteria to meet for permits, requirements aimed at reducing availability and accessibility, and setting in place social safeguards to mitigate potential problem gambling.

Regulatory bodies 
Prior to the formation of the Gambling Regulatory Authority (GRA), there were various regulatory bodies governing gambling in Singapore. As of 2022, GRA is the current single regulatory body overseeing gambling in Singapore.

The CRA was formed in 2008 to regulate management and operation of the casinos in Singapore, ensuring they remained free from criminal influence or exploitation. It also ensured that gaming in a casino is conducted honestly, and that casinos do not cause harm to minors, vulnerable persons and society at large.

The Gambling Regulatory Unit (GRU), under the MHA, controlled fruit machines and remote gambling activities.

Gambling Regulatory Authority 
On 3 April 2020, the Ministry of Home Affairs (MHA) announced that a new Gambling Regulatory Authority will be formed by 2021 to control all gambling activities in Singapore, as opposed to having many agencies regulating it like the CRA (which only regulates casinos) and the MHA's Gambling Regulatory Unit. The Singapore Police Force will continue enforcement against illegal gambling activities with the Ministry of Social and Family Development dealing with gambling issues.

At the same time, current gambling laws are under review and will be amended with the intention to regulate activities traditionally not seen as gambling, like physical mystery boxes and online loot boxes.

The Gambling Regulatory Authority of Singapore (GRA) was reconstituted from the CRA on 1 August 2022. GRA is a statutory board under the Ministry of Home Affairs and is responsible for regulating the gambling industry in Singapore.

References 

Gambling in Singapore